Paul Fitzgerald may refer to:

Paul Fitzgerald (actor) (born 1970), American actor
Paul Fitzgerald (painter) (1922–2017), Australian portrait painter
Paul Fitzgerald (born 1961), English cartoonist known as Polyp
Paul Fitzgerald (journalist), American journalist
Paul Fitzgerald (Gaelic footballer), Irish Gaelic football player
Paul Fitzgerald (boxer), Irish Olympic boxer
Paul J. Fitzgerald, Roman Catholic priest and president of the University of San Francisco
Paudie Fitzgerald, Irish cyclist